Julie Rokotakala is an Anglican priest, the Vicar General of the Anglican Diocese of Wellington: the Vicar of Kapiti, formerly of myTawa- Linden,  she was Archdeacon of Wellington from 2013 until 2015; and has been Archdeacon of Kapiti since 2011 and Ohariu since 2013.

References

Archdeacons of Wellington
Archdeacons of Kapiti
Archdeacons of Ohariu
Living people
Year of birth missing (living people)